White Shirt Creek is a stream in the U.S. state of South Dakota.

White Shirt Creek has the name of Chief Fred White Shirt, a member of the Sioux tribe.

See also
List of rivers of South Dakota

References

Rivers of Corson County, South Dakota
Rivers of South Dakota